The 1899 All-Ireland Senior Football Championship was the 13th staging of Ireland's premier Gaelic football knock-out competition. Dublin were the winners, completing the first three-in-a-row.

Results

Leinster

Munster

The match finished at half time, as the Cork ball had burst, and Tipperary did not have a ball.

Tipperary refused to take the field for the second half. They asked that their score in the first match be added to their first half score in this match.

All-Ireland final

Championship statistics

Miscellaneous
 It was a first three in a row for Dublin as All Ireland Champions.

References